Zeenat Abdullah Channa (Sindhi: زينت عبداللٰه چنه January 4, 1919 – July 12, 1974) was an educationist and writer of Sehwan, Sindh, Pakistan. She was one of the first female writers who wrote Sindhi stories after the partition of India in 1947. She served as an editor of Monthly Magazine Marvi. She motivated parents of rural Sindh to educate their girls. She was a teacher and a story writer. She also wrote literary articles.

Childhood and personal life
Zeenat Abdullah Channa was born on 4 January 1919 at Sehwan Sharif, District Jamshoro, Sindh, Pakistan. Her father Muhammad Saleh Channa was a postmaster. Her younger brother Mahboob Channa was a scholar and renowned writer. She studied at her hometown Sehwan and then Training College for Women Hyderabad. She started her career as a School teacher in Talti, a town near Sehwan Sharif. She retired as Head Mistress. During her teaching career she always encouraged young girls for education.

She married Abdullah Khan Channa on 13 August 1944. Her husband was Deputy Collector of Sehwan. He was also a researcher and writer.

Literary contributions
Zeenat Channa was one of the best Sindhi story writers after the partition of India in 1947. Her stories were published in reputable Sindhi magazines including Mehran and Naeen Zindagi. She also authored a number of good quality literary articles and essays. Some of her best stories include Randiko (Toy), oondahi (Darkness), and Mithi (Sweet). She served as an editor of Monthly women magazine "Marvi" which was very popular among the readers. She compiled a book titled Yadgar e Latif in 1958.

Death
She died on 12 July 1974 in Hyderabad, Sindh, Pakistan.

References

Sindhi-language writers
Writers from Sindh
Sindhi people
Pakistani writers
Pakistani women writers
Sindhi female writers
1919 births
1974 deaths